The Watcher in the Water is a fictional creature in J. R. R. Tolkien's Middle-earth; it appears in The Fellowship of the Ring, the first volume of The Lord of the Rings. Lurking in a lake beneath the western walls of the dwarf-realm Moria, it is said to have appeared after the damming of the river Sirannon, and its presence was first recorded by Balin's dwarf company 30 or so years before the beginning of The Fellowship of the Ring. 

The origins of the creature are not described in Tolkien's works, but critics have compared it to the legendary kraken and to Odysseus's passage between the devouring Scylla and the whirlpool Charybdis. Its presence in combination with the barrier lake and the formidable Doors of Durin have been likened to the multiple obstacles often found in Norse mythology.

Literature
In The Lord of the Rings, the Fellowship of the Ring are on a quest to Mount Doom to destroy the One Ring made by the Dark Lord Sauron. During their journey, they face two evil choices to cross the Misty Mountains: over the mountain of Caradhras through the Redhorn Gate pass, or through Moria, a dark labyrinth of tunnels and pits. They first try the mountain pass, but the weather proves too severe, and the Fellowship turn back and approach Moria's West Gate, beside which the Watcher lived in a lake. 
It is said to have appeared after the damming of the local river Sirannon, and its presence was first recorded by Balin's dwarf company 30 or so years before the beginning of The Fellowship of the Ring. When the party approaches the Gate, the Watcher seizes Frodo Baggins with a long, pale-green, luminous, fingered tentacle, succeeded by twenty more. The Company rescue Frodo and retreat into Moria, and the Watcher seals the Doors of the West Gate shut. As Gandalf commented, "Something has crept or been driven out of the dark water under the mountains. There are older and fouler things than orcs in the deep places of the world." He privately notes that the creature reached for Frodo, the Ring-bearer, first out of all the members of the company. 

Later, the Fellowship find the Book of Mazarbul, a record of Balin's failed expedition of Dwarves to reclaim Moria. In the last pages of the book, the scribe, revealed to be Ori, relates: "We cannot get out. We cannot get out. They [the Orcs] have taken the Bridge and second hall. ... the pool is up to the wall at Westgate. The Watcher in the Water took Óin. We cannot get out. The end comes ... drums, drums in the deep ... they are coming."

Concept and creation

The "Watcher in the Water", or just "the Watcher", is the only name Tolkien gave to this creature.

An early version of the Fellowship's encounter with the Watcher is found in The Return of the Shadow. Tolkien's account of the creature at this stage is practically the same as in the final published version.  Its emergence, physical appearance, abilities, attack on the Fellowship, and the breaking of the Moria Gate are already present in his initial writings.

Reception

 

In The Complete Tolkien Companion, J. E. A. Tyler suggests that the Watcher was a cold-drake: "these dragons rely on their strength and speed alone (the creature that attacked the Ring-bearer near the Lake of Moria may have been one of these)". 

The essayist Allison Harl writes that the Watcher may be a kraken created and bred by Morgoth in Utumno, and that it represents a gatekeeper whose goal, in the context of the archetypal journey, is to keep the heroes from entering into new territory, psychologically or spiritually. This "guardian theory" has been echoed by writers such as Joseph Campbell and Bill Moyers.

The scholar of English literature Charles A. Huttar compares the combination of the Watcher in the Water and the "clashing gate" when the Fellowship pass through the Doors of Durin, only to have the Watcher smash the rocks behind them, to Greek mythology's  Wandering Rocks near the opening of the underworld, and to Odysseus's passage between the devouring Scylla and the whirlpool Charybdis.

The scholar Jonathan Evans describes the monster as "the vague Watcher in the Water" and "a many-tentacled creature". He notes Gandalf's description, and compares this with Gandalf's later statement that "the world is gnawed by nameless things" in Moria's deepest places, older even than Sauron "and unknown even to him".

Marjorie Burns, a scholar of English literature, situates the Watcher in the Water as part of a triple obstacle to entering Moria: "ominous obstructing waters, the Watcher within, and highly resistant doors". She comments that such a "piling up of opposition" is characteristic of Norse mythology, in which it is common for there to be massive obstacles, unwelcoming gates, aggressive dogs and "persistent guardians".

Adaptations

The Watcher in the Water appears in Peter Jackson's The Fellowship of the Ring (2001). In Jackson's adaptation, the Watcher is portrayed as a colossal, octopus-like monster. Jackson stated in the commentaries that the original idea was to have the Watcher drag Bill the pony, who was carrying the party's baggage, underwater. In the concept art gallery feature on the DVD, the artists John Howe and Alan Lee explain that the Watcher was one of the most difficult creatures to design as Tolkien had written so little about it.

The Lord of the Rings Strategy Battle Game by Games Workshop, based on Jackson's film, calls the Watcher in the Water the "Guardian of the Doors of Durin".

References

Primary
This list identifies each item's location in Tolkien's writings.

Secondary

Middle-earth animals
Literary characters introduced in 1954
Sea monsters
Characters in British novels of the 20th century
Fictional monsters
Middle-earth monsters

fi:Veden valvoja